The SS Meredith Victory was a United States Merchant Marine Victory ship, a type of cargo freighter built for World War II. Under the leadership of Captain Leonard LaRue, Meredith Victory is credited with the largest humanitarian rescue operation by a single ship, evacuating more than 14,000 refugees in a single trip during the Korean War. The vessel has often been described as the "Ship of Miracles" as it was designed to carry only 12 passengers with a 47-person crew.

History
The SS Meredith Victory was named after Meredith College, a small women's college in North Carolina. The ship was built to transport supplies and equipment overseas during World War II. During World War II, it was operated by American President Lines. In 1950, it was laid up at Olympia, Washington, as part of the National Defense Reserve Fleet. The ship was then deployed in the Korean War.

In December 1950, United Nations Command (UNC) troops were executing a tactical withdrawal from the Chosin Reservoir against the People's Volunteer Army (PVA) and Korean People's Army forces. Over 100,000 UNC soldiers were to evacuate the city of Hungnam on 193 ships bound for the southern port of Pusan. News of the evacuation spread, and nearly an equal number of civilians also gathered at the port, hoping to board these vessels as well.

On December 21, Captain Leonard LaRue decided to unload nearly all weapons and supplies from his ship in order to evacuate as many refugees as possible. Boarding went on from the afternoon of December 22 until the next morning. Using booms and makeshift elevators, the crew filled the five cargo holds and the entire main deck. Although the ship was built to accommodate only 12 passengers, besides the crew and staff, more than 14,000 Korean civilians were crammed aboard. The ship had no escort or means of self-defense.

Years later, LaRue would reflect on that trip:

I think often of that voyage. I think of how such a small vessel was able to hold so many persons and surmount endless perils without harm to a soul. And, as I think, the clear, unmistakable message comes to me that on that Christmastide, in the bleak and bitter waters off the shores of Korea, God's own hand was at the helm of my ship.

Despite the fact that the refugees were "packed like sardines in a can" and most had to remain standing up, shoulder-to-shoulder, in freezing weather conditions during the entire voyage, there were no injuries or casualties on board. There was very little food or water, and the people were virtually unable to move. J. Robert Lunney, Staff Officer on the ship and a navy veteran of World War II, stated:

There's no explanation for why the Korean people, as stoic as they are, were able to stand virtually motionless and in silence. We were impressed by the conduct of the refugees, despite their desperate plight. We were touched by it.

First Mate D.S. Savastio, who only had first aid training, delivered five babies during the three-day passage to safety. The ship arrived in Pusan on Christmas Eve, but no one was allowed off except a few wounded and those identified as communist sympathizers. Meredith Victory had to travel another  to Geoje Island before it could debark its passengers on December 26.

Among the passengers were the parents of Moon Jae-in, the 19th President of South Korea. He was born on Geoje Island two years after the evacuation.

Captain LaRue remained in command until the ship was decommissioned in 1952. He left the sea and became a Benedictine monk of Newtown Abbey, New Jersey. On March 25, 2019, Bishop Arthur Serratelli, bishop of the Roman Catholic Diocese of Paterson opened the canonization cause for Captain LaRue, known as Brother Marinus, OSB.

After the Korean War, the ship sat in the harbor of Bremerton, Washington, as part of the "mothball fleet" until it was put back in service in 1966 for some missions during the Vietnam War. For the Vietnam War, she was converted to a troop ship.

In 1973, the ship was laid up in Suisun Bay. In 1993, it was towed to China and scrapped.

Awards and distinctions

After the war, the South Korean government honored the crew with the Korean Presidential Unit Citation. The United States Merchant Marine awarded the ship's crew the Meritorious Service Medal, its highest honor. On August 24, 1960, the SS Meredith Victory was conferred the title of "Gallant Ship" by a special act of the U.S. Congress that was signed by President Dwight D. Eisenhower.

The Department of Transportation declared it "the greatest rescue in the history of mankind". Guinness World Records has described it as "the largest evacuation from land by a single ship".

Depictions
The documentary film Ship of Miracles, describes the events of the rescue.

The SS Meredith Victory is featured prominently in the 2012 historical novel Hope in Hungnam.

The drama film Ode to My Father begins with the Hungnam evacuation in 1950 and shows the evacuation process by the ship in detail.

The evacuation and the SS Meredith Victory play a part in the series finale of Timeless (TV series) (season 2 episode 11 "The Miracle of Christmas - Part 1")

Bibliography 
Notes

References

External links
 Ship of Miracles
 MEREDITH VICTORY MEDIA COMPANY

World War II merchant ships of the United States
Vietnam War merchant ships of the United States
Cargo ships of the United States
Ships built in Los Angeles
Victory ships
1945 ships
Troop ships of the United States